General Richard William Penn Curzon-Howe, 3rd Earl Howe,  (14 February 1822 – 25 September 1900), was a British peer and professional soldier.

Background
Curzon-Howe was the second son of Richard Curzon-Howe, 1st Earl Howe, and first wife, Lady Harriet Georgiana Brudenell.

Military career
In 1838, Curzon-Howe joined the British Army and rose through the ranks as a Major General in 1869, a Lieutenant General in 1877 and a General in 1880. He fought in the Kaffir War and was present at the Siege of Delhi, for which he was appointed a CB in 1858. In 1876, Curzon inherited his elder brother's titles. He was appointed Honorary Colonel of the Prince Albert's Own Leicestershire Yeomanry Cavalry in 1876 on the death of his brother (Lt.Col. Commandant PAOLYC [1870–79] George, 2nd Earl Howe), Colonel of the 94th and 17th Regiment of Foot in 1879 and Colonel of the 2nd Life Guards in 1890. In 1897, he was appointed a GCVO for his services as Lord Lieutenant of Leicestershire, a post he held between 1888 and 1900.

Family
Lord Howe married Isabella Maria Katherine Anson (born 1832), eldest daughter of The Hon. George Anson and wife The Hon. Isabella Elizabeth Annabella Weld-Forester, on 8 February 1858. They had four children: 
Richard George Penn Curzon, 4th Earl Howe (1861–1929).
Lady Evelyn Alice Curzon (1862–1913), who married John Eyre in 1896.
Hon. Frederick Graham Curzon (1868–1920), who married actress Ellis Jeffreys and left children, including Commander Chambré George William Penn Curzon, or the actor George Curzon (1898–1976), the father of the present 7th Earl who succeeded his second cousin in 1984.
Lady Edith Cecilia Curzon (d. 1936) who married Harry Walter Franklin in 1896.

References

External links

British Army generals
British Life Guards officers
British military personnel of the Indian Rebellion of 1857
Companions of the Order of the Bath
3
Knights Grand Cross of the Royal Victorian Order
Lord-Lieutenants of Leicestershire
1822 births
1900 deaths
Richard
Richard
Younger sons of earls